Oguzhan Palace is the official residence and principal workplace of the president of Turkmenistan, located on Independence Square in the capital city of Ashgabat in Turkmenistan. It has been the site of the presidential headquarters and home of the president of Turkmenistan since the late 1990s. President Saparmyrat Nyýazow lived in the palace from 1997 until his death in 2006, where he also died. The new building was built in May 2011, replacing the smaller Türkmenbaşy Palace located nearby.

The Palace is part of a larger complex also containing the Prezident Köşgi ('Presidential Palace') which is on the west side of the complex bordered by the  Independence Square. The complex is bordered on the north by Köşk Köçesi ('Palace Street', former Karl Marx Street) and on the south by Galkynyş Köçesi ('Renaissance Street'). This street runs all the way to the southeastern tip of the complex bordering Galkynyş meýdany ('Renaissançe Square'). On the east it is bordered by the Beýik Saparmyrat Türkmenbaşy Street.

Turkmenbashy Palace 

French construction firm Bouygues built the presidential palace in 1997 for then-President of Turkmenistan Saparmyrat Nyýazow. The original presidential palace was once notable for its flamboyant appearance, but it was subsequently overshadowed in architectural stature by large buildings in oil-rich Kazakhstan, and even impoverished Tajikistan.

Evolution 

Bouygues subsequently built a replacement palace, dubbed Oguzhan in honour of the mythical progenitor of the Turkic nations.  Construction began in 2008, and ended 18 May 2011. President Gurbanguly Berdimuhamedov attended the opening. The cost of a new palace $250 million.

Halls of the palace 
Welcoming ceremonies of arriving dignitaries are held in the central hall of the palace.  Called the Golden Hall, it is intended for high-level bilateral talks. Gorkut Ata Hall is another conference hall. Seljuk Han Hall is the site of the signing of bilateral agreements and intergovernmental agreements. The Bayram Han Hall is used for press conferences and press briefings. The Magtymguly Hall is used for a variety of meetings and cultural events.  The palace complex also features a separate banquet hall used for entertaining visiting heads of state and of international organisations.

Numismatics

References

External links 

 Turkmenistan Government
 Turkmenistan Presidential Palace Complex construction

Palaces in Turkmenistan
Presidential residences
Official residences in Turkmenistan
Buildings and structures in Ashgabat
2011 establishments in Turkmenistan
Buildings and structures completed in 2011